Politics is Sébastien Tellier's second album, released in 2004. It features prominent drumming provided by Tony Allen. The songs are sung in English, German and Spanish.

Track listing
 "Bye-bye"
 "League Chicanos"
 "Wonderafrica"
 "Broadway" 
 "La Ritournelle"
 "Benny"
 "Slow Lynch"
 "Mauer"
 "La Tuerie"
 "Ketchup vs Genocide"
 "Zombi"

References

2004 albums
Sébastien Tellier albums